Kosta may refer to:

 Kosta, Estonia, a village in Vihula Parish, Lääne-Viru County, Estonia
 Kosta, Greece a community in Greece 
 Kosta, Sweden, a village in Sweden
 Coastal Andhra, region in India
 Kosta Glasbruk, a glassworks in Sweden
 Constantine (name), a shortened form common in Bulgaria and Greece (Kostandino)
 Kosta (given name), Serbian masculine given name
 Kosta (architectural feature), in Hindu temples

See also
 
 Costa (disambiguation)
 Costas (disambiguation)
 Koshta, a Hindu caste